

Bishops appointed by the Tudors

Bishops appointed by the Stuarts

Bishops appointed by the Hanoverians

Bishops appointed by the Windsors

References
The Armorial Bearings of the Bishops of Chester, compiled by the Cheshire Heraldry Society 

Armorials of the United Kingdom
Bishops of Chester
Cheshire-related lists
Personal armorials